Touraj Keshtkar (born 26 May 1987), known professionally as Tooji, is a Norwegian singer, painter, model and television host. He represented Norway in the Eurovision Song Contest 2012 in Baku, Azerbaijan and finished 26th (last) in the final. Beginning with his single "Cocktail", he also started using the kanji characters  in his artistic identity.

Career
Tooji Keshtkar was born in Shiraz, Iran, and moved to Norway when he was one year old. At the age of 16, he started modelling. Afterwards, he started working on MTV Norway where he presented "Super Saturday" and "Tooji's Top 10". 
He was also educated as a social worker and has worked in asylum reception centres. He now works as a child protection consultant in the department of after-care.

He won Melodi Grand Prix 2012 and was given the opportunity to represent Norway in the Eurovision Song Contest 2012 in Baku, Azerbaijan with his entry "Stay"   which qualified from the second semi-final and went on to place 26th (last) in the final, scoring 7 points.

On 10 March 2012, he presented the international jury votes on behalf of Norway at the finals of Melodifestivalen 2012, the Swedish preselection. On 18 May 2013 he presented the Norwegian votes for the Eurovision Song Contest 2013 held in Malmö, Sweden.

Since 2012, Tooji presents, with Margrethe Røed, the Melodi Grand Prix Junior in Norway. In 2013, he released a single entitled "Rebels". Tooji himself describes ‘Rebels’ as “dramatic pop-dance, with new organic elements blended in with hard electronica“.

He moved to Stockholm to advance his sound. With the release of the song "Packin' Guns". He combines electronic elements with urban heavy and organic sound.  Tooji uses irony to contrasts with a dark and heavy beat. With his education and background as a social worker, his songs often express a political and social message. Tooji's single "Cocktail" deals with the gender roles in today's society. The music video starts with a quotation from Gloria Steinem: "We've begun to raise daughters more like sons... but few have the courage to raise our sons more like our daughters". After coming out, he released his The Father project. Tooji's single and EP Father emanating from the project is about sexual relationships in the church and the hypocrisy in the public positions of the church. The music video for his following single "Say Yeah" tackles homophobic hate crimes.

Personal life
Tooji holds a bachelor's degree in child welfare. He has worked in asylum reception centres helping children and teenage refugees and victims of human trafficking. This work motivated him to use his songs and profile to speak out for those who suffer in silence. Tooji is a supporter of LGBT and women's rights, as well as a supporter of Green Wave, Iran's democratic reform movement. Tooji wore a Free Iran green bracelet during his performance in the Eurovision Song Contest 2012 held in Baku, Azerbaijan.

In June 2015, Tooji came out as gay to the Norwegian website Gaysir, stating that he hoped he could make it easier for young gay people by being open about his own sexuality. He was praised for his decision by the Norwegian National Association for Lesbians, Gays, Bisexuals and Transgender People.

The Father Project and single
His EP and single "Father" was part of his coming out process by tackling the difficult subject of sex and the church. He said "My new video "Father" is out, and so am I!".

The music video is filmed inside an Oslo church and depicts Tooji, hooded and caped like a monk, interrupting an attractive priest in the middle of his sermon and kisses him passionately, after which the video cuts to the couple having gay sex in front of the altar, along with generally approving reactions of the congregation met with a lot of criticism. Ole Christian Kvarme, the Bishop of Oslo of the Lutheran Church of Norway, condemned the video as "totally unacceptable" and "a gross misuse of the church", accusing the video's producers of misinforming the church's administration prior to filming about the video's actual contents.

Tooji said he lost his job as a host to Melodi Grand Prix Junior, a version of Eurovision for younger performers as a result of the "Father" video and the Father Project. "The reason I was fired was that the music video was not consistent with being a role model for children," he said. The Father Project is an attack on organized religion's hypocrisy and willingness to persecute others for being different. Tooji called this project as "the most important thing I've done in my life".

Discography

Extended plays

Singles

References

External links
Tooji's official site

1987 births
Norwegian television presenters
Living people
Norwegian social workers
English-language singers from Norway
Eurovision Song Contest entrants of 2012
Eurovision Song Contest entrants for Norway
People from Shiraz
Naturalised citizens of Norway
Iranian emigrants to Norway
Gay singers
Iranian LGBT people
Norwegian LGBT singers
Norwegian gay musicians
21st-century Norwegian male singers
20th-century Norwegian LGBT people
21st-century Norwegian LGBT people